1st Training Centre  (Polish: 1 Osrodek Szkolenia Lotniczego - 1.OSL) is a training unit of Polish Air Force directly under command of Polish Air Force Academy. Unit is stationed on 6th Air Base in Dęblin and operates various training aircraft.

Equipment

References

See also
1st Tactical Squadron
3rd Tactical Squadron
7th Tactical Squadron
8th Tactical Squadron
10th Tactical Squadron
41st Tactical Squadron
2nd Airlift Squadron
13th Airlift Squadron
14th Airlift Squadron
36th Special Aviation Regiment

Military units and formations of the Polish Air Force